"Bathwater" is a ska punk song written by Tom Dumont, Tony Kanal, and Gwen Stefani for No Doubt's fourth studio album Return of Saturn (2000).  It was released as the album's fourth and final single on November 14, 2000.

Background and writing
The song was written in only ten minutes, opening with slow New Orleans funeral brass and Adrian Young as a human beat-box.  The lyrics discuss overcoming insecurities about a relationship with adoration.  The lyric "to wash in your old bathwater" means accepting a lover's faults.

"Bathwater" is a ska punk song written in the key of E minor.  It is composed in swing time with a medium swing and moves at a moderately fast tempo of 138 beats per minute.  The song's verses are carried by perfect fifth chords with a i-IV chord progression.  Some use minor key piano chords on the off beat.  Stefani's vocal range spans over two octaves in the song, from G3 to B5.

Critical reception
"Bathwater" received mixed reviews from music critics.  Entertainment Weekly described the song's cabaret style as campy and noted that "even lovelorn teen girls may... think it's pretty yucky."  Rolling Stone described it as a combination of 2 Tone and the slapstick of farces by Gilbert and Sullivan that "never drops the band's signature blend of adrenaline and sugar."  In its review of The Singles 1992-2003, musicOMH disagreed and referred to it as an "uncomfortable merging" of 1940s dance music and the work of 2 Tone band Madness.

Chart performance
The single was a commercial failure, contradicting the overall success of the Return of Saturn project. In the United States, the song failed to enter the Billboard Hot 100 and barely entered the Billboard Adult Top 40 chart, inching to number 39.

In the territories where the song did chart, it performed poorly. On the Australian ARIA Singles Chart, the single managed a number 71 peak position. In Germany, the song reached number 73.

On American Idol (season 6), Sanjaya Malakar performed "Bathwater", the week that Gwen Stefani was the mentor for the contestants. This performance is most famed for the mohawk Malakar wore, which was composed of seven ponytails.

Music video
The music video was directed by Sophie Muller, who also directed the video to their previous single, "Simple Kind of Life". The whole video comprises dancing. In it, Adrian Young cross-dresses as Gwen by wearing a platinum blonde wig and a black dress and Gwen appears herself with her trademark platinum blonde hair and wearing a black shirt saying "CAN'T TOUCH THIS" in glittery writing. It also features members of the burlesque group The Pussycat Dolls.

Track listing
 Bathwater (G. Stefani/T. Kanal/T. Dumont) - 4:03
 Beauty Contest (G. Stefani/T. Kanal) - 4:14
 Under Construction (G. Stefani/T. Kanal) - 3:12
 Ex-Girlfriend - Acoustic Live (G. Stefani/T. Dumont/T. Kanal) - 3:50

Charts

Invincible Overlord Remix

"Bathwater (Invincible Overlord Remix)" was released as a single to promote the album The Singles 1992–2003, although the version on the album is the original version from Return of Saturn, not the remixed version. The song was remixed by Invincible Overlord, No Doubt guitarist Tom Dumont's side project. "Bathwater" was not originally released in the UK as a single; however, it was issued in 2004 as the second single from The Singles 1992–2003, as a double A-side with a re-release of previous single "It's My Life". The single peaked at number 17 on the UK Singles Chart. The video for "Bathwater (Invincible Overlord Remix)" is an edited version of the original video. It was the last single released by No Doubt before their five-year hiatus due to Gwen Stefani's solo career.

Track listings
CD single
 "Bathwater" (Invincible Overlord remix)
 "It's My Life" (Jacques Lu Cont's Thin White Duke mix)
 "Bathwater" (Invincible Overlord remix) (video)
 "It's My Life" (video)

UK CD single – "It's My Life" / "Bathwater"
 "It's My Life" – 3:48
 "Bathwater" (Invincible Overlord Remix) - 3:07
 "It's My Life" (Jacques Lu Cont's Thin White Duke Mix) - 6:59
 "It's My Life" (Chocolate O'Brian Remix) - 5:43
 "Bathwater" (Invincible Overlord Remix Video)
 "It's My Life" (Video)

Charts

References

External links
 No Doubt's official site
 "Bathwater" lyrics
 

2000 singles
2000 songs
Interscope Records singles
Music videos directed by Sophie Muller
No Doubt songs
Song recordings produced by Glen Ballard
Song recordings produced by Jerry Harrison
Songs written by Gwen Stefani
Songs written by Tom Dumont
Songs written by Tony Kanal